For information on all North Greenville University sports, see North Greenville Crusaders
The North Greenville Crusaders football program is the intercollegiate American football team for North Greenville University located in the U.S. state of South Carolina. The team competes as the NCAA Division II level as a member of the Gulf South Conference (GSC). North Greenville's first football team was fielded in 1994. The team plays its home games at the 5,000 seat Younts Stadium in Tigerville, South Carolina. The Crusaders are coached by Jeff Farrington.

History

Notable former players
Notable alumni include:
Andrew Jordan (American football)
Clayton Holmes
Jonathon Sharpe
Nick Rosamonda
Freddie Martino
Willy Korn
Chauncy Haney

Year-by-year results
Statistics correct as of the end of the 2018-19 college football season

1988 North Greenville Mounties Football team  Junior College 9-1   

1989 North Greenville Mounties Football team  Junior College 9-0

1990 North Greenville Mounties Football team  Junior College 7-2

1991 North Greenville Mounties Football team  Junior College 8-0

1992 North Greenville Mounties Football team  Junior College 7-3

1993 North Greenville Mounties Football team  Transition to 4 year 5-5

Championships

Conference championships
 Mid-South Conference (1998)

Individual Conference Honors

Mid-South Honors

Player of the Year
1998: Derek Burnette (QB)
Coach of the Year
1998: Scott Parker

ALL Mid-South 1st Team
1996: Anthony Johnson (DB)
1996: CoCo Henderson (RB)
1996: Patrick Banister (P)
1996: PJ Crosby (WR)
1996: Scott Buchanan (OL)
1996: Vernon Adams (DL)
1997: Patrick Banister (P)
1998: Derek Burnett (QB)
1998: Patrick Banister (K)
1998: Patrick Banister (P)
1998: Jerome Kennedy (SB)
1999: Trevor Cole (TE)
1999: Jamie Ballenter (P)
2000: Jamie Ballenter (P)
ALL Mid-South 2nd Team
1996: Kamell Evans (DB)
1996: Michael Edmunds (DL)
1996: Stuart Fulcher (LB)
1997: Derek Burnette (QB)
1997: Clay Sims (OL)
1998: Aaron Moose (OL)
1998: Chris Davis (WR)
1998: Trevor Cole (TE)
1998: Scott Simpson (DL)
1999: Aaron Moose (OL)
1999: Chris Davis (WR)
1999: Corey Fountain (QB)
1999: James Rice (RB)
2000: Anton Gist (DB)

Gulf South Honors

Defensive Player of the Year
2019: Chauncy Haney (DL)
Defensive Freshman of the Year
2021: De'Iveon Donald
2022: Kendrick Clark Jr

ALL-GSC 1st Team
2018: Seth Laughter (DL)
2019: Aaron Watson (DB)
2019 Chauncy Haney (DL)
2019: Johnny Worthy (BT)
2021: Myles Prosser (P)
2021: Nick Jones (STU)
2022: De'Iveon Donald (LB)
2022: Myles Prosser (P)
ALL-GSC 2nd Team
2018: Demajiay Rooks (WR)
2019: Jordan Helms (TE)
2019: Dantevian Byrd (LB)
2019: Aaron Watson (DB)
2019: Chauncy Haney (BT)
2021: Dre' Williams (AP)
2021: De'Iveon Donald (LB)
2021: Aaron Watson (DB)
2022: Corey Watkins (RB)
2022: Lewis McBeth (OL)
2022: Kwame Livingston (DL)
2022: Kendrick Clark Jr (DB)

References

External links
 

 
American football teams established in 1994
1994 establishments in South Carolina